Private Domain is an American pop/rock band. The band originated in San Diego, USA in 1985 (see 1985 in music). The band's members are songwriter Paul Shaffer (vocals; not to be confused with Paul Shaffer of the Late Show with David Letterman), songwriter Jack Butler (guitar), Jim Reeves (bass) and Matt Taylor (drums). Shaffer and Butler previously played together in the pop rock/reggae rock band Bratz, which released two albums, Bratz in 1980 and Absolute perfection in 1983.

Pato Banton was hired to rap on a Private Domain song written by Butler/Shaffer called "Absolute Perfection" also found on his 1987 album "Never Give In"

Lineup
 Paul Shaffer – vocals
 Jack Butler – guitar
 Jim Reeves – bass
 Matt Taylor – drums

Discography

Studio albums
 1988 Private Domain
 1994 Total Sanctuary
 1998 Big Time Love
 2002 Private Domain Unplugged
 2007 Great Leaders

Soundtracks
 1985 Back To The Beach
 1985 Once Bitten

External links

 Complete guide to Private Domain's bio, disco, and news

Musical groups established in 1985
1985 establishments in California